Braum's is an American chain of ice cream parlor and fast food restaurants. Based in Oklahoma City, Oklahoma, Braum's was founded in 1968 by William Henry "Bill" Braum in Oklahoma City. The company operates over 300 restaurants in 5 states, primarily in the Southern United States, namely the West South Central states of Oklahoma and Texas.

History

In 1957, William Henry "Bill" Braum (1928–2020) purchased his family's ice cream processing business based in Emporia, Kansas, as well as its "Peter Pan" retail ice cream chain; ten years later, the Peter Pan stores were sold, under the condition that the Braum family would not sell ice cream in Kansas for ten years.

Having kept the family dairy herd and ice cream processing business, Braum and his wife Mary started the Braum's chain in 1968 in Oklahoma City, opening 24 stores in Oklahoma during the first year. Braum's brought products from its Emporia headquarters to Oklahoma for the first few years, later opening facilities in Oklahoma and moving the herd there in 1975.

Braum's ran a series of Ernest P. Worrell television commercials in the 1980s.

Stores
In order to maintain the freshness of its products, the company does not open stores outside of a 300-mile (483 km) radius of the home farm in Tuttle, Oklahoma. As of 2017, there are almost 300 stores in operation, with 128 stores in Oklahoma, 99 in Texas, 27 in Kansas and 13 in both Arkansas and Missouri.

Products
The restaurants serve ice cream, frozen yogurt, hamburgers, sandwiches, salads and breakfast items. Stores also include a grocery section called the "Fresh Market" featuring dairy products, baked goods, beverages, frozen entrees, meats and produce.

Braum's is noteworthy for its level of vertical integration. Almost all the food products sold at Braum's are processed or manufactured directly by the company; Braum's owns its own feed mill, dairy herd, dairy processing plant, bakery, stores, and delivery trucks. The dairy farm has specified times during which it is open for public tours and is a popular destination for school field trips. Braum's describes itself as the only major ice cream maker to still milk its own cows. They also produce the packaging used for their dairy products.

A2 Milk

Braum's Family Farm is home to the largest A2 milk dairy herd in the United States. A1 and A2 are genetic variants of the beta-casein milk protein. Most cow milk is A1. Non-cow milk, including that of buffalo, camels, donkeys, goats, sheep, yaks and even human mothers are mostly A2, which limits exposure to "cow milk protein allergies, including lactose intolerance". It took over 12 years to build the A2 herd. With the established A2 herd, Braum’s is now producing only A2 milk for sale in its own Braum’s stores.

References

External links

 
 Encyclopedia of Oklahoma History and Culture – Braum's Dairy
 Nostalgia website C'mon Fwank pays tribute to Braum's

Companies based in Oklahoma City
Privately held companies based in Oklahoma
Restaurants in Oklahoma
Economy of the Western United States
Regional restaurant chains in the United States
Fast-food chains of the United States
Restaurants established in 1968
Ice cream parlors in the United States
1968 establishments in Oklahoma
Ice cream brands
Dairy products companies of the United States
Oklahoma culture